Nikolsk is the name of several inhabited localities in Russia.

Modern localities
Urban localities
Nikolsk, Nikolsky District, Penza Oblast, a town in Nikolsky District of Penza Oblast
Nikolsk, Vologda Oblast, a town in Nikolsky District of Vologda Oblast

Rural localities
Nikolsk, Altai Krai, a selo in Nikolsky Selsoviet of Zmeinogorsky District in Altai Krai; 
Nikolsk, Arkhangelsk Oblast, a selo in Nikolsky Selsoviet of Vilegodsky District in Arkhangelsk Oblast
Nikolsk, Aurgazinsky District, Republic of Bashkortostan, a village in Tolbazinsky Selsoviet of Aurgazinsky District in the Republic of Bashkortostan
Nikolsk, Tatyshlinsky District, Republic of Bashkortostan, a village in Verkhnetatyshlinsky Selsoviet of Tatyshlinsky District in the Republic of Bashkortostan
Nikolsk, Yanaulsky District, Republic of Bashkortostan, a village in Orlovsky Selsoviet of Yanaulsky District in the Republic of Bashkortostan
Nikolsk, Bryansk Oblast, a settlement in Lotakovsky Rural Administrative Okrug of Krasnogorsky District in Bryansk Oblast; 
Nikolsk, Kabansky District, Republic of Buryatia, a selo in Sherginsky Selsoviet of Kabansky District in the Republic of Buryatia
Nikolsk, Mukhorshibirsky District, Republic of Buryatia, a selo in Nikolsky Selsoviet of Mukhorshibirsky District in the Republic of Buryatia
Nikolsk, Tunkinsky District, Republic of Buryatia, a selo in Tunkinsky Selsoviet of Tunkinsky District in the Republic of Buryatia
Nikolsk, Irkutsky District, Irkutsk Oblast, a selo in Irkutsky District of Irkutsk Oblast
Nikolsk, Kirensky District, Irkutsk Oblast, a village in Kirensky District of Irkutsk Oblast
Nikolsk, Abansky District, Krasnoyarsk Krai, a selo in Nikolsky Selsoviet of Abansky District in Krasnoyarsk Krai
Nikolsk, Motyginsky District, Krasnoyarsk Krai, a settlement in Mashukovsky Selsoviet of Motyginsky District in Krasnoyarsk Krai
Nikolsk, Pirovsky District, Krasnoyarsk Krai, a village in Bushuysky Selsoviet of Pirovsky District in Krasnoyarsk Krai
Nikolsk, Sharypovsky District, Krasnoyarsk Krai, a selo in Rodnikovsky Selsoviet of Sharypovsky District in Krasnoyarsk Krai
Nikolsk, Tyukhtetsky District, Krasnoyarsk Krai, a village in Novomitropolsky Selsoviet of Tyukhtetsky District in Krasnoyarsk Krai
Nikolsk, Krutinsky District, Omsk Oblast, a village in Tolokontsevsky Rural Okrug of Krutinsky District in Omsk Oblast
Nikolsk, Ust-Ishimsky District, Omsk Oblast, a selo in Nikolsky Rural Okrug of Ust-Ishimsky District in Omsk Oblast
Nikolsk, Znamensky District, Omsk Oblast, a village in Cheredovsky Rural Okrug of Znamensky District in Omsk Oblast
Nikolsk, Kolyshleysky District, Penza Oblast, a selo in Pleshcheyevsky Selsoviet of Kolyshleysky District in Penza Oblast
Nikolsk, Perm Krai, a village in Bardymsky District of Perm Krai
Nikolsk, Smolensk Oblast, a village in Gagarinskoye Rural Settlement of Gagarinsky District in Smolensk Oblast
Nikolsk, Tyumen Oblast, a village in Yevsinsky Rural Okrug of Golyshmanovsky District in Tyumen Oblast

Alternative names
Nikolsk, alternative name of Nikolskoye, a selo in Nikolsky Selsoviet of Sovetsky District in Altai Krai;

Historical names
Nikolsk, name of the city of Ussuriysk in Primorsky Krai, Russia in 1917–1926

See also
Nikolsky (inhabited locality), several inhabited localities in Russia